Aleksandar Mesarović (born 27 September 1998) is a Serbian footballer who plays for Radnički Niš.

Club career

Vojvodina
Originating from Krčedin, Mesarović came through the Vojvodina youth academy and joined the first-team at the age of 18. On 28 June 2017, Mesarović signed his first professional contract, penning a four-year-deal with the club. Passing the complete pre-season with the first team, Mesarović made his official debut for the club as a playmaker in 2–1 victory over MFK Ružomberok in the first leg of the first qualifying round for 2017–18 UEFA Europa League. He also made his Serbian SuperLiga debut on 21 July 2017, in 1–0 home win against Čukarički.

Radnički Niš
On 20 January 2022 as midfielder and a member of the Serbian national team under the age of 18, 19 and 21, and former Vojvodina prospect Mesarović join to Meraklije. In the Novi Sad team, he already collaborated with coach Radoslav Batak who leads Meraklije at the moment.
After Vojvodina, and several spells to performed Napredak and Kabel, he arrived in Niš from IMT. He signed with Radnički Niš as a free agent.

International career
In summer 2015, Ivan Tomić invited Mesarović in Serbia u18 team. After a year with the selection, Mesarović was also a member of the under-19 level, making 2 appearances at the memorial tournament "Stevan Vilotić - Ćele" in matches against France and Israel. Mesarović got his first call in Serbian under-21 team by coach Goran Đorović in August 2017. Mesarović made his debut for the team in 4–0 victory over Gibraltar u21 at the Jagodina City Stadium on 1 September 2017.

Career statistics

Club

References

External links
 
 
 
 

1998 births
Living people
Association football midfielders
Serbian footballers
Serbia youth international footballers
FK Vojvodina players
FK Napredak Kruševac players
FK Kabel players
FK IMT players
FK Radnički Niš players
Serbian First League players
Serbian SuperLiga players
Serbia under-21 international footballers